Pamplico is a town in southeastern Florence County, South Carolina, United States. The population was 1,226 at the 2010 census. It is part of the Florence Metropolitan Statistical Area.

Geography
Pamplico is located in eastern Florence County at  (33.996071, -79.567777). South Carolina Highway 51, a secondary thoroughfare for traffic to Myrtle Beach, passes through the town center.

Demographics

As of the census of 2000, there were 1,139 people, 419 households, and 323 families residing in the town. The population density was 615.2 people per square mile (237.7/km2). There were 463 housing units at an average density of 250.1 per square mile (96.6/km2). The racial makeup of the town was 45.04% White, 52.50% African American, 0.35% Native American, 0.09% Asian, 1.05% from other races, and 0.97% from two or more races. Hispanic or Latino of any race were 1.49% of the population.

There were 419 households, out of which 36.3% had children under the age of 18 living with them, 44.2% were married couples living together, 26.7% had a female householder with no husband present, and 22.9% were non-families. 20.3% of all households were made up of individuals, and 8.1% had someone living alone who was 65 years of age or older. The average household size was 2.70 and the average family size was 3.11.

In the town, the population was spread out, with 28.7% under the age of 18, 10.4% from 18 to 24, 24.8% from 25 to 44, 23.6% from 45 to 64, and 12.5% who were 65 years of age or older. The median age was 34 years. For every 100 females, there were 89.5 males. For every 100 females age 18 and over, there were 85.0 males.

The median income for a household in the town was $28,304, and the median income for a family was $31,618. Males had a median income of $27,000 versus $24,028 for females. The per capita income for the town was $14,233. About 26.8% of families and 31.7% of the population were below the poverty line, including 50.8% of those under age 18 and 15.2% of those age 65 or over.

Education
Public education in Pamplico is administered by Florence County School District 2.  The district operates Hannah-Pamplico Elementary/Middle School and Hannah-Pamplico High School on a single campus.

Pamplico has a public library, a branch of the Florence County Library System.

Notable person
Ken Ard, former South Carolina lieutenant governor
Josh Turner, Country Music Artist

References

Towns in Florence County, South Carolina
Towns in South Carolina
Florence, South Carolina metropolitan area